David Bowie (1947–2016) was an English actor and musician.

David Bowie may also refer to:

 David Bowie (1967 album), his eponymous 1967 album
 David Bowie (1969 album), his eponymous 1969 album
 David Bowie (box set), box set of his albums released in 2007
 "David Bowie," song by Phish

See also
 David Bowe (disambiguation)
 David Zowie (born 1981), English DJ and record producer
 Heteropoda davidbowie, spider named after David Bowie

Bowie, David